t Nopeind is a hamlet in the Dutch province of North Holland. It is a part of the municipality of Amsterdam, and lies about 7 km northeast of the city centre, just north of Zunderdorp.

't Nopeind is a part of the deelgemeente (sub-municipality) Amsterdam-Noord. The hamlet has about 35 inhabitants.

References

Populated places in North Holland
Amsterdam-Noord
Geography of Amsterdam